Jérémy Lauzon (born April 28, 1997) is a Canadian professional ice hockey defenceman for the Nashville Predators of the National Hockey League (NHL). Lauzon was drafted by the Boston Bruins in the second round (52nd overall) in the 2015 NHL Entry Draft. He also spent time playing for the Seattle Kraken.

Playing career
After two seasons with the Rouyn-Noranda Huskies of the Quebec Major Junior Hockey League (QMJHL), Lauzon was selected in the second round (52nd overall) by the Boston Bruins in the 2015 NHL Entry Draft.

Lauzon was returned to the Huskies for the 2015–16 season. On November 12, 2015, the Bruins signed him to a three-year, entry-level contract. That season, Lauzon was named to the QMJHL 2nd All-Star Team.

Lauzon joined the Bruins' American Hockey League (AHL) affiliate, the Providence Bruins, for the 2017–18 season. He missed 22 games due to a concussion. Lauzon finished the season with one goal and six assists in 52 games.

Lauzon made his NHL debut during the 2018–19 season on October 25, 2018, in a 3–0 win against the Philadelphia Flyers. On November 11, he scored his first career NHL goal against Malcolm Subban in a 4–1 win over the Vegas Golden Knights. In total, Lauzon skated in 16 games for Boston, as well as 29 in Providence.

On February 9, 2020, Lauzon was given a two-game suspension for an illegal check to the head of Arizona Coyotes' forward Derek Stepan the previous night. On February 14, the Bruins signed Lauzon to a two-year, $1.7 million contract extension.

On July 21, 2021, Lauzon was selected from the Bruins at the 2021 NHL Expansion Draft by the Seattle Kraken.

On March 20, 2022, just days before the trade deadline, Lauzon was traded by Seattle to the Nashville Predators in exchange for a 2022 second-round draft pick.

Personal life
Lauzon has two younger brothers. Zachary was selected in the second round, 51st overall, by the Pittsburgh Penguins in the 2017 NHL Entry Draft. The two were teammates with the Huskies. However, Zachary retired in September 2019 due to concussion symptoms. Their youngest brother, Émile, currently plays for the Val-d'Or Foreurs of the QMJHL. His younger sister, Amélie, plays civil volleyball with the Gatineau Griffons.

Career statistics

Regular season and playoffs

International

Awards and honours

References

External links
 

1997 births
Living people
Boston Bruins players
Boston Bruins draft picks
Canadian ice hockey defencemen
Nashville Predators players
Ice hockey people from Quebec
People from Val-d'Or
Providence Bruins players
Rouyn-Noranda Huskies players
Seattle Kraken players